Kanpetlet  is a town in the Chin State of West Myanmar and the home of the Kanpetlet Township administration body. It is known for Mt. Victoria, the highest peak in the Chin Hills and one of the highest in Western Myanmar, and Natmataung National Park, home of some of the world's rarest bird species.

Under British rule Kanpetlet was one of the two districts in the Chin Hills. However, due to its isolated location and lack of large enough population to support development, it has become one of the least developed townships in Chin State and Myanmar.

Kan Pet Let is the home of the southern Chin tribes of the Dai, Da Yindu, Uppu, Mun and Ng'gha clans. It can be found especially in ancient Burmese official literature. Around its border there are Saw, Mindat, Paletwa, Setottayar and Minpyar townships.

External links
Satellite map at Maplandia.com

Township capitals of Myanmar
Populated places in Chin State